KRCD may refer to:

 Kings River Conservation District, dealing with the Kings River (California)
 KRCD (FM), a radio station (103.9 FM) licensed to Inglewood, California, United States